The monarchy of Tuvalu is a system of government in which a hereditary monarch is the sovereign and head of state of Tuvalu. The current Tuvaluan monarch and head of state since 8 September 2022, is King Charles III. As sovereign, he is the personal embodiment of the Tuvaluan Crown. Although the person of the sovereign is equally shared with 14 other independent countries within the Commonwealth of Nations, each country's monarchy is separate and legally distinct. As a result, the current monarch is officially titled King of Tuvalu and, in this capacity, he and other members of the royal family undertake public and private functions domestically and abroad as representatives of the Tuvaluan state. However, the King is the only member of the Royal Family with any constitutional role.

All executive authority is vested in the monarch, and royal assent is required for the Tuvaluan Parliament to enact laws and for letters patent and Orders in Council to have legal effect. Most of the powers are exercised by the elected members of parliament, the ministers of the Crown generally drawn from amongst them, and the judges and justices of the peace. Other powers vested in the monarch, such as the appointment of a prime minister, are significant but are treated only as reserve powers and as an important security part of the role of the monarchy.

The sovereign is recognised in the Constitution of Tuvalu as a symbol of the unity and identity of Tuvalu. The Crown primarily functions as a guarantor of continuous and stable governance and a nonpartisan safeguard against the abuse of power. While some powers are exercisable only by the sovereign, most of the monarch's operational and ceremonial duties are exercised by his representative, the governor-general of Tuvalu.

Origin 

The Ellice Islands were administered as a British Protectorate from 1892 to 1916, as part of the British Western Pacific Territories (BWPT), by a Resident Commissioner based in the Gilbert Islands. The administration of the BWTP ended in 1916, and the Gilbert and Ellice Islands Colony was established, which existed until October 1976.

In 1974, the ministerial government was introduced to the Gilbert and Ellice Islands Colony through a change to the Constitution. In that year a general election was held, and a referendum was held in 1974 to determine whether the Gilbert Islands and Ellice Islands should each have their own administration. As a consequence of the referendum, separation occurred in two stages. The Tuvaluan Order 1975, which took effect on 1 October 1975, renamed Ellice Islands as "Tuvalu", and recognised Tuvalu as a separate British dependency with its own government. The second stage occurred on 1 January 1976, when separate administrations were created out of the civil service of the Gilbert and Ellice Islands Colony.

Tuvalu achieved full independence in 1978 within the Commonwealth, as an independent constitutional monarchy.

The preamble to the Constitution of independent Tuvalu recites that the Ellice Islands, after coming under the protection of Queen Victoria in 1892, had, in January 1916, in conjunction with the Gilbert Islands, become known as the Gilbert and Ellice Islands Colony; and that after the Ellice Islands had been established by Queen Elizabeth II as a separate colony in October 1975 under their ancient name of Tuvalu, a constitution had been adopted which was given the force of law by Order in Council, taking effect on 1 October 1978. The constitution now provides that Queen Elizabeth II is, at the "request of the people of Tuvalu", the sovereign and head of state of Tuvalu and that references to the sovereign extend to the sovereign's heirs and successors.

The Tuvaluan Crown and its aspects 

Tuvalu is one of fifteen independent nations, known as Commonwealth realms, which shares its sovereign with other monarchies in the Commonwealth of Nations, with the monarch's relationship with Tuvalu completely independent from his position as monarch of any other realm. Despite sharing the same person as their respective monarch, each of the Commonwealth realms – including Tuvalu – is sovereign and independent of the others. The Tuvaluan monarch is represented by a viceroy—the governor-general of Tuvalu—in the country.

Since Tuvaluan independence in 1978, the pan-national Crown has had both a shared and a separate character and the sovereign's role as monarch of Tuvalu is distinct to his or her position as monarch of any other realm, including the United Kingdom. The monarchy thus ceased to be an exclusively British institution and in Tuvalu became a Tuvaluan, or "domesticated" establishment.

This division is illustrated in a number of ways: The sovereign, for example, holds a unique Tuvaluan title and, when he is acting in public specifically as a representative of Tuvalu, he uses, where possible, Tuvaluan symbols, including the country's national flag, unique royal symbols, and the like. Also, only Tuvaluan government ministers can advise the sovereign on matters of the country.

In Tuvalu, the legal personality of the State is referred to as "The Crown in Right of Tuvalu".

Title 
The Royal Style and Title Act 1987 of the Tuvaluan Parliament granted a separate title to Queen Elizabeth II for use in relation to Tuvalu. Thereafter, the Queen's official Tuvaluan title became: Elizabeth the Second, by the Grace of God Queen of Tuvalu and of Her other Realms and Territories, Head of the Commonwealth.

Since the accession of King Charles III, the monarch's title is: Charles the Third, by the Grace of God King of Tuvalu and of His other Realms and Territories, Head of the Commonwealth.

This style communicates Tuvalu's status as an independent monarchy, highlighting the monarch's role specifically as Sovereign of Tuvalu, as well as the shared aspect of the Crown throughout the Commonwealth. Typically, the sovereign is styled "King of Tuvalu", and is addressed as such when in Tuvalu, or performing duties on behalf of Tuvalu abroad.

Succession 

Succession is by absolute primogeniture governed by the provisions of the Succession to the Crown Act 2013, as well as the Act of Settlement, 1701, and the Bill of Rights, 1689. This legislation limits the succession to the natural (i.e. non-adopted), legitimate descendants of Sophia, Electress of Hanover, and stipulates that the monarch cannot be a Roman Catholic, and must be in communion with the Church of England upon ascending the throne. Though these constitutional laws, as they apply to Tuvalu, still lie within the control of the British parliament, both the United Kingdom and Tuvalu cannot change the rules of succession without the unanimous consent of the other realms, unless explicitly leaving the shared monarchy relationship; a situation that applies identically in all the other realms, and which has been likened to a treaty amongst these countries.

Personification of the state 

As the living embodiment of the Tuvaluan Crown, the Sovereign is regarded as the personification of the Tuvaluan state. It is confirmed in section 50 of the Constitution of Tuvalu, which states that the head of state is recognised as a symbol of the unity and identity of Tuvalu. The powers of the head of state are set out in section 52 of the Constitution.

As the embodiment of the state, the sovereign is the locus of oaths of allegiance, required of many employees of the Crown, as well as by new citizens, as per the Citizenship Act. This is done in reciprocation to the sovereign's Coronation Oath, wherein they promise to govern the peoples of their realms, "according to their respective laws and customs".

Constitutional role and royal prerogative 

The Constitution of Tuvalu gives Tuvalu a parliamentary system of government under a constitutional monarchy, wherein the role of the monarch and governor-general is both legal and practical, but not political. The Crown is regarded as a corporation, in which several parts share the authority of the whole, with the sovereign as the person at the centre of the constitutional construct, meaning all powers of state are constitutionally reposed in the sovereign. The government of Tuvalu is also thus formally referred to as His Majesty's Government.

Most of the monarch's domestic duties are performed by the governor-general, appointed by the monarch on the advice of the prime minister of Tuvalu.

Executive 

One of the main duties of the Crown is to appoint a prime minister, who thereafter heads the Cabinet of Tuvalu and advises the monarch or governor-general on how to execute their executive powers over all aspects of government operations and foreign affairs. The monarch's, and thereby the viceroy's role is almost entirely symbolic and cultural, acting as a symbol of the legal authority under which all governments and agencies operate, while the Cabinet directs the use of the Royal Prerogative, which includes the privilege to declare war, and maintain the King's peace, as well as to summon and prorogue parliament and call elections. However, it is important to note that the Royal Prerogative belongs to the Crown and not to any of the ministers, though it might have sometimes appeared that way, and the constitution allows the governor-general to unilaterally use these powers in relation to the dismissal of a prime minister, dissolution of parliament, and removal of a judge in exceptional, constitutional crisis situations.

There are also a few duties which are specifically performed by the monarch, such as appointing the governor-general.

The governor-general, to maintain the stability of the Tuvaluan government, appoints as prime minister the individual most likely to maintain the support of the Parliament of Tuvalu. The governor-general additionally appoints a Cabinet, at the direction of the prime minister. The monarch is informed by his viceroy of the acceptance of the resignation of a prime minister and the swearing-in of a new prime minister and other members of the ministry, and he remains fully briefed through regular communications from his Tuvaluan ministers. Members of various executive agencies and other officials, such as High Court justices, are also appointed by the Crown.

Foreign affairs 

The Royal Prerogative further extends to foreign affairs: the governor-general ratifies treaties, alliances, and international agreements. As with other uses of the Royal Prerogative, no parliamentary approval is required. However, a treaty cannot alter the domestic laws of Tuvalu; an Act of Parliament is necessary in such cases. The governor-general, on behalf of the monarch, also accredits Tuvaluan High Commissioners and ambassadors and receives diplomats from foreign states. In addition, the issuance of passports falls under the Royal Prerogative and, as such, all Tuvaluan passports are issued in the name of the monarch. The first page of a Tuvaluan passport reads:

Parliament 

The governor-general is responsible for summoning the Parliament of Tuvalu and may at any time prorogue or dissolve parliament. The opening of a new parliamentary session is marked by the Speech from the Governor-General, which outlines the government's legislative agenda. A general election follows dissolution, the writs for a general election are usually dropped by the governor-general at Government House, Funafuti.

As all executive authority is vested in the sovereign, Royal Assent is required to allow for bills to become law. Therefore, all laws in Tuvalu are assented to by the governor-general in the monarch's name.

Courts 

The sovereign is responsible for rendering justice for all his subjects, and is thus traditionally deemed the fount of justice. In Tuvalu, criminal offences are legally deemed to be offences against the sovereign and proceedings for indictable offences are brought in the sovereign's name in the form of Rex versus [Name] ("Rex" being Latin for "King"). Hence, the common law holds that the sovereign "can do no wrong"; the monarch cannot be prosecuted in his or her own courts for criminal offences.

The sovereign, and by extension the governor-general, can also grant immunity from prosecution, exercise the royal prerogative of mercy, and pardon offences against the Crown, either before, during, or after a trial. The exercise of the 'Power of mercy' to grant a pardon and the commutation of prison sentences is described in section 80 of the Constitution.

All justices of the High Court of Tuvalu are appointed by the governor-general.

The highest court of appeal for Tuvalu is the Judicial Committee of the King's Privy Council.

Cultural role 

The King's Official Birthday is a public holiday in Tuvalu. In Tuvalu, it is usually celebrated on the second Saturday of June every year. Tuvaluans celebrate it with church services and prayers, singing God Save The King and Tuvalu mo te Atua, flag hoisting, public speeches, a Royal Salute, and a parade. As the King's Birthday is a public holiday, all government offices, educational institutions, and most businesses are closed for the day.

Tuvaluans also celebrated the birthday of the former Prince of Wales (now Charles III). Heir to the Throne Day was a public holiday in November.

The Crown and Honours 

Within the Commonwealth realms, the monarch is deemed the fount of honour. Similarly, the monarch, as Sovereign of Tuvalu, confers awards and honours in Tuvalu in his name. Most of them are often awarded on the advice of "His Majesty's Tuvalu Ministers".

The Crown and the Police Force 

The Crown sits at the pinnacle of the Tuvalu Police Force. It is reflected in Tuvalu's patrol vessels, which bear the prefix HMTSS, i.e., His Majesty's Tuvalu Surveillance Ship.

Under Section 159(5) of the Tuvaluan constitution, the chief of the police force is appointed by the monarch, in accordance to the advice of the Public Service Commission after consultation with the Tuvaluan cabinet. Under the Police Act of Tuvalu, every member of the Tuvalu Police Force has to swear allegiance to the monarch of Tuvalu, on being enrolled. The current oath is:

Royal visits 
The Queen of Tuvalu and the Duke of Edinburgh toured Tuvalu between 26 and 27 October 1982. The royal couple were carried around in ceremonial litters and later served with traditional local dishes on a banquet. They also installed the corner-stone of a future Parliament building. A sheet of commemorative stamps was issued for the royal visit by the Tuvalu Philatelic Bureau.

In 2012, the Duke and Duchess of Cambridge visited Tuvalu to mark the Queen’s Diamond Jubilee. They toured a number of places. Dressed in colourful grass skirts, they also took part in the traditional dancing.

Republic referendums

1986 referendum 

In February 1986, a nation-wide referendum was held to ask Tuvaluans whether Tuvalu should remain a constitutional monarchy, with the Queen as its head of state, or become a republic. Only one atoll favoured the republican proposal, while more than 90% voters favoured the retention of the monarchy.

2008 referendum 

In the first years of the 21st century there was a debate about the abolition of the monarchy. Prime Minister Saufatu Sopoanga had stated in 2004 that he was in favour of replacing the Queen as Tuvalu's head of state, a view supported by popular former Prime Minister Ionatana Ionatana; Sopoanga also stated that public opinion would be evaluated first before taking any further moves. Former Prime Minister Kamuta Latasi also supported the idea.

A referendum was held in Tuvalu in 2008, giving voters the option of retaining the monarchy, or abolishing it in favour of a republic. The monarchy was retained with 1,260 votes to 679 (64.98%).

List of Tuvaluan monarchs

See also 

 Lists of office-holders
 List of prime ministers of Elizabeth II
 List of prime ministers of Charles III
 List of Commonwealth visits made by Elizabeth II
 Monarchies in Oceania
 List of monarchies

References

External links 
 , at the Royal Family website

Government of Tuvalu
Politics of Tuvalu
Tuvalu
Heads of state of Tuvalu
1978 establishments in Tuvalu
Tuvalu
Kingdoms